Benjamin Franklyn Searight (May 20, 1873 – July 12, 1937) was an American football player and coach. He served as the head football coach at the University of Montana in 1898, compiling a record of 3–2. Searight was an 1895 graduate of William Jewell College in Liberty, Missouri. He started at left halfback for the Stanford University football team in 1898 as a postgraduate student.

Head coaching record

References

External links
 

1873 births
1937 deaths
19th-century players of American football
American football halfbacks
Montana Grizzlies football coaches
Stanford Cardinal football players
William Jewell College alumni
People from Frankfort, Kentucky
Players of American football from Kentucky